The African Movement of Working Children and Youth (AMWCY), or  (Maejt) in french, is a network of associations of working children from 20 African countries. The purpose of this child-led organization is to protect working minors through the establishment of local benefit societies, awareness campaigns to influence public opinion, and negotiations with political authorities. The movement has a bulletin entitled Lettre de la rue and in 1999 it published the book  ("Voice of the children of Africa"), which has been translated into several languages.

The movement was formally created in July 1994 in Bouaké (Côte d'Ivoire), where the first international meeting was held. At the Bouaké meeting, the movement's "vision" and a list of 12 priority rights for working children were outlined:

Vision: All African children must be born and grow in good condition, and enjoy their full rights to thrive, while at the same time helping their communities to develop harmoniously in peace and in a favorable environment.

Priority rights:
 The right to be respected
 The right to be taught a trade
 The right to stay in the village (not to migrate)
 The right to work in a safe environment
 The right to light and limited work
 The right to rest when sick
 The right to be listened to
 The right to healthcare
 The right to learn to read and to write
 The right to play
 The right to self-expression and to form organizations
 The right to equitable legal aid, in case of difficulty.

AMWCY has gained the support of ECOWAS, Save the Children, Plan, ILO and UNESCO and it has branches in 21 countries, including Angola, Benin, Burkina Faso, Burundi, Cameroon, Chad, Côte d'Ivoire, Democratic Republic of Congo, Ethiopia, Gambia, Guinea, Guinea Bissau, Madagascar, Mali, Mauritania, Niger, Nigeria, Rwanda, Senegal, Togo and Zimbabwe.

The AMWCY has also established relationships with similar organizations in other parts of the world (for example India and South America) and AMWCY delegates have been invited to several international meetings about minors and their rights, such as the 1996 Unicef convention on minor labour in Africa and the 2002 special UN session on infancy.

See also
 Child sexual abuse
 Child labour

References
VVAA. Voix des enfants d'Afrique

External links
  MAEJT

Child labour-related organizations
Child-related organisations in Senegal